

Events and publications

 Stan Lee becomes editor-in-chief at Timely Comics.
 Adventures of Captain Marvel, a twelve-chapter film serial adapted from the popular Captain Marvel comic book character for Republic Pictures, debuts. It was the first film adaptation of a comic book superhero.

January
 January 9: In The Adventures of Tintin story The Crab With the Golden Claws, prepublished in the juvenile supplement of Le Soir, Tintin and Captain Haddock first meet.
 January 10: The first issue of the Turkish children's magazine Cemal Nadir ve Arkadaş is launched, by Cemal Nadir Güler. It nevertheless only lasted 17 weeks. 
 Action Comics (1938 series) #32 - National Periodical Publications
 Adventure Comics (1938 series) #58 - National Periodical Publications
 All-American Comics (1939 series) #22 - National Periodical Publications
 Crack Comics (1940 series) #9 - Quality Comics
 Detective Comics (1937 series) #47 - National Periodical Publications
 Flash Comics (1940 series) #13 - National Periodical Publications
 Hit Comics (1940 series) #7 - Quality Comics
Human Torch Comics (1940 series) #3 – Timely Comics
 Marvel Mystery Comics (1939 series) #15 - Timely Comics
 Master Comics (1940 series) #10 - Fawcett Comics
 More Fun Comics (1936 series) #63 - National Periodical Publications
 Mystery Men Comics (1939 series) #18 - Fox Feature Syndicate
 Smash Comics (1939 series) #18 - Quality Comics
 Whiz Comics (1940 series) #12 - Fawcett Comics

February
 Action Comics (1938 series) #33 - National Allied Publications
 Adventure Comics (1938 series) #59 - National Allied Publications
 All-American Comics (1939 series) #23 - National Allied Publications
 Crack Comics (1940 series) #10 - Quality Comics
 Detective Comics (1937 series) #48 - National Allied Publications
 Flash Comics (1940 series) #14 - National Allied Publications
 Hit Comics (1940 series) #8 - Quality Comics
 Marvel Mystery Comics (1939 series) #16 - Timely Comics
 Master Comics (1940 series) #11 - Fawcett Comics
 More Fun Comics (1936 series) #64 - National Allied Publications
 Mystery Men Comics (1939 series) #19 - Fox Feature Syndicate
 Smash Comics (1939 series) #19 - Quality Comics
 Superman (1939 series) #8 - National Allied Publications
 Whiz Comics (1940 series) #13 - Fawcett Comics

March
 March 16: Marten Toonder's Tom Poes makes its debut.
 Action Comics (1938 series) #34 - National Allied Publications
 Adventure Comics (1938 series) #60 - National Allied Publications
 All-American Comics (1939 series) #24 - National Allied Publications
 Better Comics (Maple Leaf) #1. In the first issue Vernon Miller's Iron Man makes his debut, the first Canadian superhero.
 Captain America Comics (1941 series) #1 - Timely Comics
 Crack Comics (1940 series) #11 - Quality Comics
 Detective Comics (1937 series) #49 - National Allied Publications
 Flash Comics (1940 series) #15 - National Allied Publications
 Hit Comics (1940 series) #9 - Quality Comics
 Marvel Mystery Comics (1939 series) #17 - Timely Comics
 Master Comics (1940 series) #12 - Fawcett Comics
 More Fun Comics (1936 series) #65 - National Allied Publications
 Mystery Men Comics (1939 series) #20 - Fox Feature Syndicate
 Mystic Comics (1940 series) #5 - Timely Comics
 Smash Comics (1939 series) #20 - Quality Comics
 Whiz Comics (1940 series) #14 - Fawcett Comics
 Whiz Comics (1940 series) #15 - Fawcett Comics

April
 April 14: First strip of Love trouble, by Floyd Gottfredson and Merrill De Maris. First and only appearance of the Mickey Mouse’s female cousin Madeleine, who temporarily replaces Minnie as girlfriend of the hero.   
Action Comics (1938 series) #35 - National Allied Publications
 Adventure Comics (1938 series) #61 - National Allied Publications. In this issue Gardner Fox and Jack Burnley's Starman debuts.
 All-American Comics (1939 series) #25 - National Allied Publications
 All-Star Comics (1940 series) #4 - National Allied Publications
 Batman (1940 series) #5 - National Allied Publications
 Blue Beetle (1939 series) #6 - Fox Feature Syndicate
 Captain America Comics (1941 series) #2 - Timely Comics
 Captain Marvel Adventures (1941 series) #1 - Fawcett Comics
 Crack Comics (1940 series) #12 - Quality Comics
 Daring Mystery Comics (1940 series) #7 - Timely Comics
 Detective Comics (1937 series) #50 - National Allied Publications
 Flash Comics (1940 series) #16 - National Allied Publications
 Hit Comics (1940 series) #10 - Quality Comics
 Human Torch Comics (1940 series) #4 - Timely Comics
 Marvel Mystery Comics (1939 series) #18 - Timely Comics
 Master Comics (1940 series) #13 - Fawcett Comics
 More Fun Comics (1936 series) #66 - National Allied Publications
 Mystery Men Comics (1939 series) #21 - Fox Feature Syndicate
 Smash Comics (1939 series) #21 - Quality Comics
 Sub-Mariner Comics (1941 series) #1 - Timely Comics
 Superman (1939 series) #9 - National Allied Publications
 Whiz Comics (1940 series) #16 - Fawcett Comics
 World's Best Comics (1941 series) #1 - National Allied Publications

May
 May 12: The first episode of R.B. Clark's Boofhead is published. 
 Action Comics (1938 series) #36 - National Allied Publications
 Adventure Comics (1938 series) #62 - National Allied Publications
 All-American Comics (1939 series) #26 - National Allied Publications
Big 3 (1940 series) #3 - Fox Feature Syndicate
 Captain America Comics (1941 series) #3 - Timely Comics
 Detective Comics (1937 series) #51 - National Allied Publications
 Flash Comics (1940 series) #17 - National Allied Publications
 Hit Comics (1940 series) #11 - Quality Comics
 Marvel Mystery Comics (1939 series) #19 - Timely Comics
 Master Comics (1940 series) #14 - Fawcett Comics
 More Fun Comics (1936 series) #67 - National Allied Publications
 Mystery Men Comics (1939 series) #22 - Fox Feature Syndicate
 Smash Comics (1939 series) #22 - Quality Comics
 Whiz Comics (1940 series) #17 - Fawcett Comics

June
 Action Comics (1938 series) #37 - National Allied Publications
 Adventure Comics (1938 series) #63 - National Allied Publications
 All-American Comics (1939 series) #27 - National Allied Publications
All-Winners Comics (1941 series) #1 - Timely Comics
 Blue Beetle (1939 series) #7 - Fox Feature Syndicate
 Captain America Comics (1941 series) #4 - Timely Comics
 Crack Comics (1940 series) #13 - Quality Comics
 Detective Comics (1937 series) #52 - National Allied Publications
 Flash Comics (1940 series) #18 - National Allied Publications
 Hit Comics (1940 series) #12 - Quality Comics
Human Torch Comics (1940 series) #5 - Timely Comics
 Marvel Mystery Comics (1939 series) #20 - Timely Comics
 Master Comics (1940 series) #15 - Fawcett Comics
 More Fun Comics (1936 series) #68 - National Allied Publications
 Mystery Men Comics (1939 series) #23 - Fox Feature Syndicate
 Smash Comics (1939 series) #23 - Quality Comics
Sub-Mariner Comics (1941 series) #2 - Timely Comics
 Superman (1939 series) #10 - National Allied Publications
 Whiz Comics (1940 series) #18 - Fawcett Comics
Young Allies Comics (1941 series) #1 - Timely Comics

July
 July 12: In Marten Toonder's Tom Poes story In De Tovertuin Olivier B. Bommel makes his debut.
 Action Comics (1938 series) #38 - National Allied Publications
 Adventure Comics (1938 series) #64 - National Allied Publications
 All-American Comics (1939 series) #28 - National Allied Publications
 All-Flash Comics (1941 series) #1 - National Allied Publications
 All-Star Comics (1940 series) #5 - National Allied Publications
Big 3 (1940 series) #4 - Fox Feature Syndicate
 Bulletman (1941 series) #1 - Fawcett Comics
 Captain Marvel Adventures (1941 series) #2 - Fawcett Comics
 Crack Comics (1940 series) #14 - Quality Comics
 Detective Comics (1937 series) #53 - National Allied Publications
 Flash Comics (1940 series) #19 - National Allied Publications
 Hit Comics (1940 series) #13 - Quality Comics
 Marvel Mystery Comics (1939 series) #21 - Timely Comics
 Master Comics (1940 series) #16 - Fawcett Comics
 More Fun Comics (1936 series) #69 - National Allied Publications
 Mystery Men Comics (1939 series) #24 - Fox Feature Syndicate
 Smash Comics (1939 series) #24 - Quality Comics
 Whiz Comics (1940 series) #19 - Fawcett Comics
 World's Finest Comics (1941 series) #2 - National Allied Publications - Changed from "World's Best Comics"
 Wow Comics (1940 series) #2 - Fawcett Comics

August
 August 14: Marten Toonder's Tom Poes story De Geheimzinnige Roverhoofdman is first published. Halfway the story Tom Poes' home town Rommeldam makes its debut, as do the recurring characters Bulle Bas and Brigadier Snuf. 
 Action Comics (1938 series) #39 - National Allied Publications
 Adventure Comics (1938 series) #65 - National Allied Publications
 All-American Comics (1939 series) #29 - National Allied Publications
 Blue Beetle (1939 series) #8 - Fox Feature Syndicate
 Captain America Comics (1941 series) #5 - Timely Comics
 Crack Comics (1940 series) #15 - Quality Comics
 Detective Comics (1937 series) #54 - National Allied Publications
 Flash Comics (1940 series) #20 - National Allied Publications
 Hit Comics (1940 series) #14 - Quality Comics
 Marvel Mystery Comics (1939 series) #22 - Timely Comics
 Master Comics (1940 series) #17 - Fawcett Comics
 Military Comics (1941 series) #1 - Quality Comics - It marks the debut of Will Eisner and Bob Powell's Blackhawk. 
 More Fun Comics (1936 series) #70 - National Allied Publications
 Mystery Men Comics (1939 series) #25 - Fox Feature Syndicate
 Police Comics (1941 series) #1 - Quality Comics - This marks the debut of Jack Cole's Plastic Man. 
 Smash Comics (1939 series) #25 - Quality Comics
 Superman (1939 series) #11 - National Allied Publications
 U.S.A. Comics (1941 series) #1 - Timely Comics
 Whiz Comics (1940 series) #20 - Fawcett Comics

September
 September 16: Marten Toonder's Tom Poes story De Drakenburcht is first published. Halfway the story Olivier B. Bommel's castle Bommelstein and his car, De Oude Schicht, make their debut.
 September 23: The Belgian children's comics magazine Le Soir-Jeunesse, a supplement of the Nazi-controlled newspaper Le Soir, disappears after hardly a year of publication. The Adventures of Tintin, which was published in its pages since 1940, moves within Le Soir itself.
 Action Comics (1938 series) #40 - National Allied Publications
 Adventure Comics (1938 series) #66 - National Allied Publications
 All-American Comics (1939 series) #30 - National Allied Publications
 All-Flash Comics (1941 series) #2 - National Allied Publications
 All-Star Comics (1940 series) #6 - National Allied Publications
All-Winners Comics (1941 series) #2 - Timely Comics
 Batman (1940 series) #6 - National Allied Publications
Big 3 (1940 series) #5 - Fox Feature Syndicate
 Bulletman (1941 series) #2 - Fawcett Comics
 Captain America Comics (1941 series) #6 - Timely Comics
 Captain Marvel Adventures (1941 series) #3 - Fawcett Comics
 Crack Comics (1940 series) #16 - Quality Comics
 Detective Comics (1937 series) #55 - National Allied Publications
 Doll Man (1941 series) #1 - Quality Comics
 Flash Comics (1940 series) #21 - National Allied Publications
 Green Lantern (comic book) (1941 series) #1 - National Allied Publications. This marks the debut of Bill Finger and Martin Nodell's Green Lantern.
 Hit Comics (1940 series) #15 - Quality Comics
 Human Torch Comics (1940 series) #5 - Timely Comics - This is #5b. Human Torch has its own numbering now.
 Marvel Mystery Comics (1939 series) #23 - Timely Comics
 Master Comics (1940 series) #18 - Fawcett Comics
 Military Comics (1941 series) #2 - Quality Comics
 Minute-Man (1941 series) #1 - Fawcett Comics
 More Fun Comics (1936 series) #71 - National Allied Publications
 Mystery Men Comics (1939 series) #26 - Fox Feature Syndicate
 Police Comics (1941 series) #2 - Quality Comics
 Smash Comics (1939 series) #26 - Quality Comics
 Spy Smasher (1941 series) #1 - Fawcett Comics
 Sub-Mariner Comics (1941 series) #3 - Timely Comics
 Uncle Sam Quarterly (1941 series) #1 - Quality Comics
 Whiz Comics (1940 series) #21 - Fawcett Comics
 World's Finest Comics (1941 series) #3 - National Allied Publications
 Wow Comics (1940 series) #3 - Fawcett Comics

October
 October 18: Marten Toonder's Tom Poes story Het Verdwijneiland is first published. Halfway the story the characters Wal Rus and professor Joachim Sickbock make their debut. 
 October 23: On Nazi orders two Dutch comics magazines, namely De Humorist and Sjors, are banned from publication. Sjors will nevertheless still be published but within the pages of the magazine Panorama until it finally vanishes in March 1942 and won't return until after the war in June 1947.
 Action Comics (1938 series) #41 - National Allied Publications
 Adventure Comics (1938 series) #67 - National Allied Publications
 All-American Comics (1939 series) #31 - National Allied Publications
 All Star Comics #8 marks the debut of William Moulton Marston and Harry G. Peter's Wonder Woman. 
 Blue Beetle (1939 series) #9 - Fox Feature Syndicate
 Captain America Comics (1941 series) #7 - Timely Comics
 Captain Marvel Adventures (1941 series) #4 - Fawcett Comics
 Crack Comics (1940 series) #17 - Quality Comics
 Detective Comics (1937 series) #56 - National Allied Publications
 Flash Comics (1940 series) #22 - National Allied Publications
 Hit Comics (1940 series) #16 - Quality Comics
 Marvel Mystery Comics (1939 series) #24 - Timely Comics
 Master Comics (1940 series) #19 - Fawcett Comics
 Military Comics (1941 series) #3 - Quality Comics
 More Fun Comics (1936 series) #72 - National Allied Publications
 Mystery Men Comics (1939 series) #27 - Fox Feature Syndicate
 Mystic Comics (1940 series) #6 - Timely Comics
 Police Comics (1941 series) #3 - Quality Comics
 Smash Comics (1939 series) #27 - Quality Comics
 Star Spangled Comics (1941 series) #1 - National Allied Publications
 Superman (1939 series) #12 - National Allied Publications
 Whiz Comics (1940 series) #22 - Fawcett Comics
 Whiz Comics (1940 series) #23 - Fawcett Comics

November
 November 24: Gus Arriola's Gordo makes its debut. 
 Action Comics (1938 series) #42 - National Allied Publications
 Adventure Comics (1938 series) #68 - National Allied Publications
Air Fighters Comics (1941 series) #1 - Hillman Periodicals
 All-American Comics (1939 series) #32 - National Allied Publications
 All-Flash Comics (1941 series) #3 - National Allied Publications
 All-Star Comics (1940 series) #7 - National Allied Publications
 America's Greatest Comics (1941 series) #1 - Fawcett Comics
 Batman (1940 series) #7 - National Allied Publications
Big 3 (1940 series) #6 - Fox Feature Syndicate
 Captain America Comics (1941 series) #8 - Timely Comics
 Crack Comics (1940 series) #18 - Quality Comics
 Detective Comics (1937 series) #57 - National Allied Publications
 Fantastic Comics (1939 series) #23 — cancelled by Fox Feature Syndicate
 Flash Comics (1940 series) #23 - National Allied Publications
 Hit Comics (1940 series) #17 - Quality Comics
 Green Lantern (comic book) (1941 series) #2 - National Allied Publications
 Human Torch Comics (1940 series) #6 - Timely Comics
 Leading Comics (1941 series) #1 - National Allied Publications
 Marvel Mystery Comics (1939 series) #25 - Timely Comics
 Master Comics (1940 series) #20 - Fawcett Comics
 Military Comics (1941 series) #4 - Quality Comics
 Minute-Man (1941 series) #2 - Fawcett Comics
 More Fun Comics (1936 series) #73 - National Allied Publications: This issue marks the debut of Paul Norris and Mort Weisinger's Aquaman.
 Mystery Men Comics (1939 series) #28 - Fox Feature Syndicate
 Police Comics (1941 series) #4 - Quality Comics
 Smash Comics (1939 series) #28 - Quality Comics
 Spy Smasher (1940 series) #2 - Fawcett Comics
 Star Spangled Comics (1941 series) #2 - National Allied Publications
 Sub-Mariner Comics (1941 series) #4 - Timely Comics
 Uncle Sam Quarterly (1941 series) #2 - Quality Comics
 U.S.A. Comics (1941 series) #2 - Timely Comics
 Whiz Comics (1940 series) #24 - Fawcett Comics
 World's Finest Comics (1941 series) #4 - National Allied Publications
 Wow Comics (1940 series) #4 - Fawcett Comics
 Young Allies Comics (1941 series) #2 - Timely Comics

December
 The couple Betsy and Stanley Baer launch their own comic strip The Toodles, drawn by Rod Ruth, which debuts in The Chicago Sun. It will run until 1965.
 Action Comics (1938 series) #43 - National Allied Publications
 Adventure Comics (1938 series) #69 - National Allied Publications
 All-American Comics (1939 series) #33 - National Allied Publications
All-Winners Comics (1941 series) #3 - Timely Comics
America's Greatest Comics (1941 series) #1 - Fawcett Comics
 Blue Beetle (1939 series) #10 - Fox Feature Syndicate
 Captain America Comics (1941 series) #9 - Timely Comics
 Captain Marvel Adventures (1941 series) #5 - Fawcett Comics
 Crack Comics (1940 series) #19 - Quality Comics
 Detective Comics (1937 series) #58 - National Allied Publications
 Flash Comics (1940 series) #24 - National Allied Publications
 Hit Comics (1940 series) #18 - Quality Comics
Human Torch Comics (1940 series) #6 - Timely Comics
 Marvel Mystery Comics (1939 series) #26 - Timely Comics
 Master Comics (1940 series) #21 - Fawcett Comics
 Military Comics (1941 series) #5 - Quality Comics
 More Fun Comics (1936 series) #74 - National Allied Publications
 Mystery Men Comics (1939 series) #29 - Fox Feature Syndicate
 Mystic Comics (1940 series) #7 - Timely Comics
 Pep Comics #22 - marks the debut of Bob Montana's Archie Comics, who will receive their own title a year later. 
 Police Comics (1941 series) #5 - Quality Comics
 Smash Comics (1939 series) #29 - Quality Comics
 Star Spangled Comics (1941 series) #3 - National Allied Publications
 Superman (1939 series) #13 - National Allied Publications
 Whiz Comics (1940 series) #25 - Fawcett Comics

Specific date unknown
 In Norway, Jostein Øvrelid and Hallvard Sandnes start the long-running science fiction series Ingeniør Knut Berg på eventyr. It will run until 1960. 
 Mutt and Jeff (1938 series) #3 - National Allied Publications.
 Roberto Sgrilli's Formichino ends.

Births

April
 April 24: Gomaa Frahat, Egyptian political cartoonist, (d. 2021).

June
 June 2: Charlie Watts, British rock drummer (The Rolling Stones) (made comic strips for his band's U.S. tour program and the back sleeve of their album Between the Buttons), (d. 2021).
 June 15: Neal Adams, American comic book artist (Batman, Superman vs. Muhammad Ali, Green Lantern), (d. 2022).

July
 July 25: S. Clay Wilson, American underground comix artist (The Checkered Demon, Captain Pissgums and His Pervert Pirates), (d. 2021).

September
 September 26: Tom Veitch, American comic book writer (The Light and Darkness War, Animal Man, Star Wars), (d. 2022).

October
 October 20: Leopold Lippens, Belgian politician (namesake of the Leopold Lippens Prize at the Comics Festival of Knokke-Heist), (d. 2021).

Deaths

January
 January 4: George Roller, British illustrator and comics artist, dies at age 84.
 Specific date in January unknown: Jaime Tomás, Spanish comics artist, dies at age 31 or 32.

February
 February 13: J.B. Lowitz, American comics artist (The Captain Kiddis Kids, Swifty and his Wonderful Dream), dies at age 57.

August
 August 13: John Stuart Blackton, British animator and film director  (The Enchanted Drawing, Humorous Phases of Funny Faces), dies at age 66.
 August 19: Caumery, French comics writer (Bécassine), dies at age 64.

October
 October 8: Win Smith, Canadian-American animator and comics artist (Penguin Pete, Looney Luke, continued Mickey Mouse, worked on Looney Tunes comics), dies at age 53. 
 October 14: Leoncio Martínez, aka Leo, Venezuelan journalist, playwright, illustrator, caricaturist and comics artist, passes away at 52 years.
 October 22: Louis Markous, Ludwig Markous and/or Louis Marcoussis, French illustrator, painter  and comics artist, dies at age 63.

November
 November 26: Patrick Kroon, Dutch caricaturist, painter, illustrator and comics artist, dies at age 69.

December
 December 4: Axel Bäckman, Swedish comics artist (Påhittiga Johansson, Rulle Rustibus), dies at age 73. 
 December 21: Arthur Racey, Canadian illustrator, caricaturist, advertising and comics artist (An Englishman in Canada), passes away at age 70 or 71.
 December 31: Sol Hess, American comics writer (The Nebbs), passes away at age 59.

First issues by title
All-Flash (Summer, National Comics)
All Winners Comics (Summer, Timely Comics)
Air Fighters Comics (November, Hillman Periodicals)

Captain America Comics (March, Timely Comics)
Captain Marvel Adventures (March, Fawcett Comics)
Classics Illustrated (Gilberton)
Green Lantern (Fall, National Comics)
Leading Comics (Winter, National Comics)
Police Comics (August, Quality Comics)
Star-Spangled Comics (October, DC Comics)
Sub-Mariner Comics (Fall, Timely Comics)
World's Finest Comics (Spring, DC Comics)
Young Allies (Marvel Comics) (Summer, Timely Comics)

Initial appearances by character name
 Anita Diminuta, created by Jesús Blasco, in Mis Chicas
Aquaman, created by Mort Weisinger and Paul Norris, in More Fun Comics #73 (November), published by DC Comics
 Archie Andrews, created by Bob Montana, in Pep Comics #22, published by MLJ Magazines
Beast-Ruler, created by George Tuska, in Captain Marvel Adventures #3 (September), published by Fawcett Comics
 Blackhawk, created by Chuck Cuidera with input from both Bob Powell and Will Eisner, in Military Comics #1 (August), published by Quality Comics
Bucky Barnes, created by Joe Simon and Jack Kirby, in Captain America Comics #1 (March), published by Timely Comics
Captain America, created by Joe Simon and Jack Kirby, in Captain America Comics #1 (March), published by Timely Comics
Captain Marvel Jr., created by France Herron  and Mac Raboy, in Whiz Comics #25 (December), published by Fawcett Comics
Captain Nazi, created by C. C. Beck and Bill Parker, in Master Comics #21 (December), published by Fawcett Comics
 Doctor Mid-Nite, created by Charles Reizenstein and Stanley Josephs Aschmeier, in All-American Comics #25 (April), published by DC Comics
Dummy (DC Comics), created by Mort Weisinger and Mort Meskin, in Leading Comics #1 (December), published by DC Comics
Firebrand (DC Comics), created by S. M. Iger and Reed crandall, in Police Comics #1 (August), published by Quality Comics
 Green Arrow, created by Mort Weisinger and George Papp, in More Fun Comics #73, published by DC Comics
Ian Karkull, created by Gardner Fox and Howard Sherman, in More Fun Comics #69 (August), published by DC Comics
Jester (Quality Comics), created by Paul Gustavson, in Smash Comics #22 (May), published by Quality Comics
 Johnny Quick (Johnny Chambers), created by Mort Weisinger, in More Fun Comics #71 (September), published by DC Comics
Midnight (DC Comics) created by Jack Cole, in Smash Comics #18 (January). published by Quality Comics
Minute-Man, created by Charlie Sultan, in Master Comics #11 (February), published by Fawcett Comics
Miss America (DC Comics), created by Elmer Wexler, in Military Comics #1 (August), published by Quality Comics
Nabu (comics), created by Gardner Fox and Howard Sherman, in More Fun Comics #67 (May), published by DC Comics
 Nelvana of the Northern Lights, created by Adrian Dingle, in Triumph-Adventure Comics #1 (August), published by Hillborough Studios
 Pat Dugan (Stripesy), created by Jerry Siegel, in Action Comics #40 (September), published by DC Comics
Paul Kirk (Manhunter), in Adventure Comics #58 (January), published by National Allied Publications
 Penguin (comics), created by Bill Finger and Bob Kane, in Detective Comics #58, published by National Allied Publications
Phantom Lady, created by Arthur F. Peddy, in Police Comics #1 (August), published by Quality Comics
 Plastic Man, created by Jack Cole, in Police Comics #1, published by Quality Comics
Queen Bee (comics), created by Ken Fitch and Bearnard Baily, in Action Comics #42 (November), published by DC Comics
Red Skull, created by Joe Simon and Jack Kirby, in Captain America Comic #7 (October), published by Timely Comics
Roy Lincoln, created by Paul Gustavson, in Police Comics #1 (August), published by Quality Comics
 Sandy Hawkins(Sandy The Golden Boy), created by Mort Weisinger and Paul Norris, in Adventure Comics #69 (December), published by National Allied Publications
 Sargon the Sorcerer, created by Steve Niles and Scott Hampton, in All-American Comics #26 (May), published by DC Comics
 Scarecrow (DC Comics), created by Bill Finger and Bob Kane, in World's Finest Comics #3 (September), published by DC Comics
 Seven Soldiers of Victory, created by Mort Weisinger and Mort Meskin, in Leading Comics #1, published by National Allied Publications
Shade (comics), created by Mort Weisinger and Mort Meskin, in Action Comics #43 (December), published by DC Comics
Shining Knight, created by Creig Flessel, in Adventure Comics #66 (September), published by DC Comics
 Speedy, created by Mort Weisinger and Paul Norris, in More Fun Comics #73 (November), published by National Allied Publications
 Starman (Ted Knight), created by Jack Burnley, in Adventure Comics #61 (April), published by DC Comics
 Star-Spangled Kid Sylvester Pemberton, created by Jerry Siegel, in Action Comics #40 (September), published by DC Comics
 Tarantula (DC Comics), created by Mort Weisinger, in Star-Spangled Comics #1 (October), published by National Allied Publications
 Vigilante (Greg Saunders), created by Mort Weisinger and Mort Meskin, in Action Comics #42 (November), published by National Allied Publications
Wildfire (Carol Vance Martin), created by Robert Turner and Jim Mooney, in Smash Comics #25, published by Quality Comics
 Wonder Woman, created by William Moulton Marston, in All Star Comics #8 (December), published by All-American Publications

References

 
Comics
Mass media timelines by year